Julia Wipplinger ( Tamsen; born 23 October 1923) is a former tennis player from South Africa who was active in the 1950s.

Career
Wipplinger teamed with fellow South African Hazel Redick-Smith to reach the doubles final at the French Championships. In the final they were defeated in straight sets by Doris Hart and Shirley Fry. They again reached the doubles final at a Grand Slam tournament two years later at the 1954 Australian Championships. This time the Australian team of Mary Bevis Hawton and Beryl Penrose won in straight sets. Her best Grand Slam performance in the singles was reaching the quarterfinals at the 1952 French Championships and the fourth round at the 1954 Wimbledon Championships.

In April 1952 she was runner-up to Doris Hart in the singles event of the South African Championships. In July 1952 she reached the singles final at the Swedish Open in Båstad but was beaten by her doubles partner Hazel Redick-Smith in straight sets. Redick-Smith also defeated her in the singles final of the 1953 South African Championships. She was part of a South African team, with Hazel Redick-Smith, Ian Vermaak, Owen Williams and Abe Segal who went on a tour in Australia in February and March 1954.

Grand Slam finals

Doubles (2 losses)

References

1923 births
Possibly living people
Place of birth missing
South African female tennis players